Yunusovo (Yonos) is a rural locality (a village) and the administrative centre of Yunusovsky Selsoviet, Mechetlinsky District, Bashkortostan, Russia. The population was 457 as of 2010. There are 10 streets.

Geography 
Yunusovo is located 22 km southeast of Bolsheustyikinskoye (the district's administrative centre) by road. Timiryakovo is the nearest rural locality.

References 

Rural localities in Mechetlinsky District